Edvin Gregorius Wahlstén (2 March 1872, Turku - 15 December 1945) was a Finnish journalist, civil servant, attorney and politician. He was a member of the Parliament of Finland from 1926 to 1927, representing the Social Democratic Party of Finland (SDP).

References

1872 births
1945 deaths
People from Turku
People from Turku and Pori Province (Grand Duchy of Finland)
Swedish-speaking Finns
Social Democratic Party of Finland politicians
Members of the Parliament of Finland (1924–27)